This is a list of localities in Transylvania that were, either in majority or in minority, historically inhabited by Transylvanian Saxons, having either churches placed in refuge castles for the local population (German: Kirchenburg = fortress church or Wehrkirche = fortified church), or only  village churches (German: Dorfkirchen) built by the Transylvanian Saxons.

See also
German exonyms (Transylvania)

Saxon localities
Alternative names of European places
Lists of place names
Names of places in Romania